Royal Gorge or variation, may refer to:

 Royal Gorge (Arkansas River), Colorado, USA; a gorge
 Royal Gorge (Missouri), USA; a gap in a ridge
 Royal Gorge Bridge, Cañon City, Colorado, USA; a bridge
 Royal Gorge Boulevard, Cañon City, Colorado, USA
 Royal Gorge (passenger train), Colorado, USA
 Royal Gorge Route Railroad, Cañon City, Colorado, USA; a train
 Royal Gorge Route, Colorado; a line on the Denver and Rio Grande Western Railroad
 Royal Gorge Cross Country Ski Resort, Soda Springs, California, USA
 Royal Gorge Fire (2013), a forest fire in Colorado, USA
 Royal Gorge blazingstar, a flower native to Colorado, USA

See also

Royal (disambiguation)
Gorge (disambiguation)
Royal Valley (disambiguation)
Vale Royal (disambiguation)